Hippichthys is a genus of pipefishes native to the Indian and Pacific Oceans and the landmasses around them.  This genus contains freshwater, brackish water and marine species.

Species
There are currently six recognized species in this genus:
 Hippichthys albomaculosus A. P. Jenkins & Mailautoka, 2010
 Hippichthys cyanospilos (Bleeker, 1854) (Blue-spotted pipefish)
 Hippichthys heptagonus Bleeker, 1849 (Belly pipefish)
 Hippichthys parvicarinatus (C. E. Dawson, 1978) (Short-keel pipefish)
 Hippichthys penicillus (Cantor, 1849) (Beady pipefish)
 Hippichthys spicifer (Rüppell, 1838) (Bellybarred pipefish)

References

 
Marine fish genera
Taxa named by Pieter Bleeker